Naval Station Lake Galveston, is a former United States Navy Naval Station. It was planned for operation in the 1980s during the creation of the Strategic Homeport program under the administration of President Ronald Reagan. It was recommended for closure under the 1988 Base Realignment and Closure Commission, as it was deemed unnecessary with recent cutbacks in the United States Navy.

External links
Galveston Naval Station

Naval Stations of the United States Navy
Galveston, Texas